Chrysophila is a genus of snout moths. It was described by Jacob Hübner in 1831.

Species
Chrysophila auriscutalis (Hübner, [1831])
Chrysophila atridorsalis (Ragonot, 1891)

References

Chrysauginae
Pyralidae genera